The National Progressive Front (al-Jabha al-Wataniyyah at-Taqaddumiyyah, NPF, sometimes known as the Progressive Patriotic and National Front) was an Iraqi popular front announced on 16 July 1973 and constituted in 1974, ostensibly formed within the framework of a "joint action programme" to establish a coalition between the Arab Socialist Ba'ath Party, the Iraqi Communist Party, the Kurdistan Revolutionary Party, a pro-government section of the Kurdistan Democratic Party, and miscellaneous independents. The Iraqi Communist Party were removed from the NPF in 1979 while the Kurdish Democratic Party suffered restrictions when Saddam Hussein came to power after 1979. The creation of the Front ensured the leading role of the Ba'athists in state and society whilst allowing limited autonomy for other participating parties loyal to the government. Saddam spoke of it once as "one of the essential forms to voice our will and to deepen democracy and political participation of the people and the national forces in building the new experiment in all fields." In effect the Front was controlled and maintained solely by the Ba'ath, with all other legal political forces acting in subservience to it.

Origins and development
The origins of the Front lay in July 1970 when the government under Ahmed Hassan al-Bakr, amid fighting the militant Iraqi Communist Party (Central Command) and dealing with Kurdish separatist militancy, offered the formation of the Front to moderate sections of the Iraqi Communists under conditions guaranteeing Ba'athist dominance over the state and political exclusivity within the armed forces. To quell Kurdish separatist sentiment an autonomy agreement was agreed to in 1970 to create Iraqi Kurdistan while attempts were made to get the Kurdistan Democratic Party to join the Front in the 1973-1974 period. This resulted in a majority section led by Mustafa Barzani continuing to rebel against the state while a smaller faction led by Hashim Aqrawi and Ahmad Muhammad Saeed al-Atrushi joined the Front.

The Iraqi Communists, despite entry into the Front, continued to experience repression such as the arrest of factory members, execution of members within the armed forces, and strong censorship of the ICP's daily newspaper. By 1979 the leadership of the ICP was either arrested or in exile, with the party itself formally withdrawing from the Front by 1980 to openly oppose the government. In the 1995-2000 period a small pro-government Iraqi Communist Party led by Yusuf Hamdan was proclaimed and its existence was tolerated, though it was not a formal member of the Front.

Upon the formation of Iraq's National Assembly in 1980 the Front was tasked with nominating candidates to stand in elections. It was disbanded in 2003 following the overthrow of the Ba'athist Government in the Iraq War.

Electoral history

National Assembly elections

See also
National Progressive Front (Syria)

References

Arab nationalism in Iraq
Arab socialist political parties
Defunct political party alliances in Iraq
Defunct socialist parties in Iraq
History of the Ba'ath Party
Iraqi Communist Party
Nationalist parties in Iraq
Organization of the Ba'ath Party
Parties of one-party systems
Political parties disestablished in 2003
Political parties established in 1974
Popular fronts